The Decree of Dionysopolis was written around 48 BC by the citizens of Dionysopolis (today's Balchik, on the Black Sea coast of Bulgaria) to Akornion, who traveled far away in a diplomatic mission to meet somebody's farther in Argedauon. The decree, a fragmentary marble inscription, is located in the National Historical Museum in Sofia.

Inscription 
The decree mentions a Dacian town named Argedauon, potentially Argidava or Argedava.

The stone is damaged and name was read differently by various editors and scholars:
 [ἐπορεύθη εἰς] Ἀργέδα[υι]ον by Wilhelm Dittenberger (1898)
 [πέμψας?] Αρ[γ]έδα[ρ]ον by Ernst Kalinka (1905)
 [...εἰ]ς Ἀργέδαυον by Wilhelm Dittenberger and Friedrich Hiller (1917), noting that the υ is an uncertain reading
 Ἀργέδαβον by Vasile Pârvan (1923)

The inscription also refers to the Dacian king Burebista, and one interpretation is that Akornion was his chief adviser (literally "first friend") in Dionysopolis. Other sources indicate that Akornion was sent as an ambassador of Burebista to Pompey, to discuss an alliance against Julius Caesar.

This leads to the assumption that the mentioned Argedava was Burebista's capital of the Dacian kingdom. This source unfortunately doesn't mention the location of Argedava and historians opinions are split in two groups.

One school of thought, led by historians Constantin Daicoviciu and Hadrian Daicoviciu, assume the inscription talks about Argidava and place the potential capital of Burebista at Vărădia, Caraș-Severin County, Romania. The forms Argidava and Arcidava found in other ancient sources like Ptolemy's Geographia (c. 150 AD) and Tabula Peutingeriana (2nd century AD), clearly place a Dacian town with those names at this geographical location. The site is also close to Sarmizegetusa, a later Dacian capital.

Others, led by historian Vasile Pârvan and professor Radu Vulpe place Argedava at Popeşti, a district in the town of Mihăilești, Giurgiu County, Romania. Arguments include the name connection with the Argeş River, geographical position on a potential road to Dionysopolis which Akornion followed, and most importantly the size of the archaeological discovery at Popeşti that hints to a royal palace. However no other sources seem to name the dava discovered at Popeşti, so no exact assumptions can be made about its Dacian name.

It is also quite possible for the two different davae to be just homonyms.

The marble inscription is damaged in many areas, including right before the word "Argedauon", and it is possible the original word could have been "Sargedauon" or "Zargedauon". This form could potentially be linked to "Zargidaua" mentioned by Ptolemy at a different geographical location. Or again, these two could be simple homonyms.

See also 
 Dacia
 List of ancient cities in Thrace and Dacia

Notes

References

External links 

 Searchable Greek Inscriptions at The Packard Humanities Institute (PHI)  - Argedava segment from Decree of Dionysopolis reviewed in Inscriptiones graecae in Bulgaria repertae by Georgi Mihailov
 A fost Argedava (Popesti) resedinta statului geto-dac condus de Burebista? - Article in Informatia de Giurgiu (Romanian)

Archaeology of Bulgaria
Balchik
Dacia
Greek inscriptions
48 BC
1st-century BC inscriptions
Dionysopolis